Robert Berkeley (1566–1614), of Pattenden, Kent, was an English politician.

Life
He was the son of Sir Maurice Berkeley of Bruton, Somerset by his second marriage to Elizabeth Sands.
He was a Member (MP) of the Parliament of England for Chippenham in 1601.

He married Elizabeth Lougher, whose father was a civil lawyer and had at least four sons and two daughters. He died in 1614 and was buried in Canterbury cathedral.

References

1566 births
1614 deaths
English MPs 1601
People from Kent